Oscar Peterson Meets Roy Hargrove and Ralph Moore is a 1996 album by Oscar Peterson. It was nominated for a 1997 Juno Award in the category of Best Mainstream Jazz Album.

Track listing
 "Tin Tin Deo" (Gil Fuller, Chano Pozo) – 5:46
 "Rob Roy" – 6:45
 "Blues for Stephane" (Oscar Peterson) – 4:55
 "My Foolish Heart" (Ned Washington, Victor Young) – 7:36
 "Cool Walk" – 7:17
 "Ecstasy" – 6:32
 "Just Friends" (John Klenner, Sam M. Lewis) – 5:49
 "Truffles" – 6:26
 "She Has Gone" – 5:28
 "North York" – 4:27

Personnel

Performance
 Oscar Peterson – piano
 Roy Hargrove – trumpet
 Ralph Moore – tenor saxophone
 Niels-Henning Ørsted Pedersen – double bass
 Lewis Nash – drums

References

1996 albums
Oscar Peterson albums
Telarc Records albums